Alpha is a Franco-Belgian comics series about a CIA operative written by Pascal Renard, illustrated by Youri Jigounov and published by Le Lombard in French and Cinebook in English.

Volumes

L'échange (May 1996)
Clan Bogdanov (May 1997)
Le salaire des loups (April 1998)
La liste (April 1999)
Sanctions (October 2000)
L'émissaire (April 2002)
Snow White, 30 secondes! (October 2003)
Jeux de puissants (November 2004)
Scala (September 2006)
Mensonges (May 2007)
Fucking patriot (September 2009)
Petit tour avec Malcolm (August 2013)
Le syndrome de Maracamba (September 2015)  
Dominos (2019)

Translations

Since July 2008, Cinebook Ltd has been publishing Alpha. Four albums have been released so far:

The Exchange (includes 'The Bogdanov Clan'; July 2008)
Wolves' Wages (April 2009)
The List (July 2010)
Sanctions (January 2014)

References

Belgian graphic novels
Bandes dessinées
Belgian comic strips
1996 comics debuts
Spy comics
Lombard Editions titles